Maryam Şahinyan (1911 in Sivas – 1996 in Istanbul, Turkey) was a famed photographer who is considered the first woman studio photographer in Turkey.  She was of Armenian descent.

Life
Maryam Şahinyan was born at Şahinyan Konağı, now known as the Camlı Köşk in the city center of Sivas, Turkey. Her grandfather,  Paşa, was the representative of Sivas in the first Ottoman Parliament established in 1877. Maryam Şahinyan's family moved to Istanbul via Samsun leaving behind assets such as the Şahinyan Konak, 5 flour mills, and large amounts of real estate. The family settled in the Harbiye district of Istanbul and soon adjusted to a new lifestyle under the Republican Era of the Turkish Republic. She attended the local Armenian school Esayan.

Maryam Şahinyan's father Mihran was avidly interested in photography. In 1933 he began to work for the Galatasaray Photography Studio in the Beyoğlu district of Istanbul. In 1936, Maryam's mother Dikranuhi died a sudden death and left the family financially strained. Due to these circumstances, Maryam was forced to dropout of the French School Sainte-Pulchérie she attended in order to help her father out in the studio. By 1937, in order to assist the financial burden of the family, she started managing the studio independently. Maryam Şahinyan managed the studio until 1985. She died at her home on Hanımefendi Sokak in Şişli in 1996 and is buried in Şişli Armenian Cemetery. Şahinyan left behind a photographic archive made up of approximately 200,000 images.  Maryam Sahinyan is considered the first woman photographer in Turkey. She knew French, Italian, Armenian and Turkish.

References 

1911 births
1996 deaths
People from Sivas
People from Sivas vilayet
Turkish people of Armenian descent
Turkish photographers
Ethnic Armenian photographers
Turkish women photographers
Burials at Şişli Armenian Cemetery
20th-century women photographers